"Only Love" is a song by English singer-songwriter Ben Howard from his debut studio album Every Kingdom. It was released as a single in the United Kingdom on 4 May 2012 as a digital download and on CD. It entered the UK Singles Chart at number 80 and rose to 37 the following week. The song was written by Ben Howard and produced by Chris Bond and Darren Lawson. The cover art was designed by Owen Tozer. A live performance of the song at the 2013 BRIT Awards where Howard won two awards, was released on 20 February 2013 as a digital download single. This version helped the single reach its peak chart position of 9.

Music video
A music video to accompany the release of "Only Love" was released onto YouTube on 8 May 2012 with a total length of three minutes and fifty-three seconds, in colour, at a variety of resolutions, running at twenty-five frames per second (progressive scan).

Track listing

Chart performance

Weekly charts

Year-end charts

Certifications

Release history

References

2012 singles
Ben Howard songs
2011 songs
Island Records singles
Songs written by Ben Howard